Proto-Eskimoan or Proto-Eskimo is the reconstructed ancestor of the Eskimoan languages. It was spoken by the ancestors of the Yupik and Inuit peoples. It is linguistically related to the Aleut language, and both descend from the Proto-Eskimo–Aleut language.

Comparative studies of Eskimo and Aleut languages suggest that the Proto-Eskimoan and Proto-Aleut languages diverged between 4000 and 2000 BCE.

Phonology
According to the International Encyclopedia of Linguistics, "Eskimo languages show variation primarily in their phonology and lexicon, rather than in syntax. Aleut phonology is quite unremarkable, compared to the interesting phenomena exhibited by most varieties of Eskimo. Proto-Eskimo had four vowels */i a u ə/, but few or none of the long vowels or diphthongs found in the modern languages."

See also 

 Proto-Eskimo–Aleut language

References

Agglutinative languages
Eskimo
Eskaleut languages